Tony Soto may refer to:

 Tony Soto (soccer) (born 1976), American soccer defender 
 Tony Soto (politician) (born 1973), Puerto Rican politician